Skjoldafjorden is a fjord in Rogaland county, Norway.

The fjord is located in the municipalities of Tysvær and Vindafjord.  The north end of the Skjoldafjorden at the village of Skjold connects to the Grindafjorden which flows from the village of Grinde to Skjold.  The south end of the fjord empties in to a large bay called the Hervikfjorden, which flows directly into the Boknafjorden.

The island Borgøy is located at the mouth of the fjord where the Hervikfjorden begins. Further to the north, the narrow passage Skjoldastraumen has strong tide flows and is rather shallow.  A lock system was built there to accommodate boat traffic.  It is the only salt water lock in Norway.

See also
 List of Norwegian fjords

References

Vindafjord
Tysvær